Islam Latinski is a village in Croatia. It is one of two "Islam" villages, the other one being Islam Grčki.

Islam Latinski has a predominantly Croatian population.

Name
The original name of the village was Saddislam, meaning "the wall of Islam" in Turkish which marked the final frontier of the Ottoman Empire.

In the 18th century, when the village split in two, the name changed to Islam Latinski. While Islam stayed from the original name, the adjective  ( meaning  "Latin") stands for the religion of the villagers - "Latin" Catholicism. The other part of the split up village, Islam Grčki, got its name from the religious belief of its settlers - "Greek" Orthodoxy.

References

Populated places in Zadar County